HMS Swinger was an  composite gunboat of the Royal Navy, built at Pembroke Dockyard and launched on 7 February 1872. She served at first on the China Station and from 1883 on the Australia Station. She was hulked in 1895 sold for breaking in 1924.

Design and construction
Designed by Sir Edward Reed, Chief Constructor of the Royal Navy, the Ariel-class gunboats were the first gunboats of composite construction. She was armed with two  64-pounder (56 cwt) muzzle-loading rifles and two  20-pounder Armstrong breech loaders. All four guns were mounted on traversing carriages. Some of the class were re-armed in the 1880s with two 5-inch and two 4-inch breech loaders. All the ships of the class carried a three-masted barquentine rig.

Operational service
Swinger served at first on the China Station and since it was Royal Navy policy to ship entire crews out to the far-flung stations, she recommissioned at Hong Kong on 18 February 1877.

She commissioned at Devonport on 2 October 1883 for service on the Australia Station.  She arrived in Australia in 1884 under the command of Lieutenant Marx and was employed in preventing the blackbirding trade.  Soon he fell in with the Forest King to the east of New Guinea, and sent Mr. Millman, the civil magistrate, on board to investigate.  On finding 60 illegally taken islanders in the Forest King, he told the master that he would be taken into port the following day, and that he would be sunk if he tried to escape.  That night Swingers quartermaster reported to Marx that the Forest King was throwing coconuts overboard.  Rushing to the deck, Marx could see through binoculars that the blackbirders were throwing their human cargo over the side in order to be rid of the incriminating evidence. Still half naked from their hammocks, Swingers seamen manned the boats and rescued 18 men from the water; about 20 men had drowned. In the morning Marx boarded the Forest King and carried her into Brisbane, where the master was tried by the Vice Admiralty Court of Inquiry.  Marx was warned not to walk the streets in uniform since considerable vested interests were affected.  Nevertheless, after three days the court convicted the master of Forest King and vindicated Lieutenant Marx.

In 1886 at St. Agnau Swinger had been trading with some natives, and considering them friendly, Marx decided to go ashore.  He was attacked and described the assault:

Swinger recommissioned in Sydney on 4 May 1887. She left the Australia Station in August 1891.

Fate
She was sold to Rogers & Company, Plymouth for breaking in June 1924.

Notes

References
Bastock, John (1988), Ships on the Australia Station, Child & Associates Publishing Pty Ltd; Frenchs Forest, Australia. 

1872 ships
Ships built in Pembroke Dock
Ariel-class gunboats
Victorian-era gunboats of the United Kingdom